A List of Revenues of the Darius I, Great King of Persia, is reported by Greek Historian Herodotus c 480 BC.  This serves to show the greatness of Darius and the Persian empire, show who was paying tribute to the empire and how much they were capable of paying.

A talent of silver was a considerable sum of money, but making exact conversions to modern currency is problematical at best.  Further compounding the problem are differences in how weights were measured.

Annual tribute (in silver talents)

References

Sources
 Herodotus III. 90-96 and cf. A. R. Burn, Persia & the Greeks (New York, 1962), pp. 123–126.

Darius the Great
Government of the Achaemenid Empire